Pandit Shyam Bihari Baijnath Mishra (8 May 1938 – 20 April 2021) was an Indian politician belonging to the Bharatiya Janata Party.

Biography
He was a member of the Lok Sabha elected from Bilhaur Lok Sabha Constituency in Kanpur district four times. He was the President of Bharatiya Udyog Vyapaar Mandal.

He died from COVID-19 in April 2021.

Positions held
1991	 Elected to 10th Lok Sabha

1991–96	 Member, Consultative Committee, Ministry of Food

1993–96	 Chairman, Committee on Food, Civil Supplies and Public Distribution

1996	 Re-elected to 11th Lok Sabha (2nd term)

1996–97	 Member, Consultative Committee, Ministry of Food

1997–98	 Member, Committee on Food, Civil Supplies and Public Distribution

1998	 Re-elected to 12th Lok Sabha (3rd term)

1998–99	 Chairman, Joint Committee on the Essential Commodities (Amendment) Bill,1998
      
Member, Committee on Food, Civil Supplies and Public Distribution; and its Sub-Committee-D on Department of Coordination and also Convenor, Sub-Committee-B on Department of Sugar and Edible Oils

Member, Committee of Privileges Member, Consultative Committee, Ministry of Communications

1999	 Re-elected to 13th Lok Sabha (4th term)

1999–2000	 Member, Committee on Food, Civil Supplies and Public Distribution,
Member, Committee on Estimates

2000–2001	 Member, Committee on Estimates

2000 onwards	 Member, Consultative Committee, Ministry of Communications

References

1938 births
People from Kanpur Nagar district
2021 deaths
Bharatiya Janata Party politicians from Uttar Pradesh
India MPs 1991–1996
India MPs 1996–1997
India MPs 1998–1999
India MPs 1999–2004
Lok Sabha members from Uttar Pradesh
Deaths from the COVID-19 pandemic in India